Merimbula Airport  is an airport serving Merimbula, New South Wales, Australia.

Facilities

Airlines and destinations

Statistics
Merimbula Airport was ranked 59th in Australia for the number of revenue passengers served in financial year 2010–2011.

See also
List of airports in New South Wales

References

External links
 

Airports in New South Wales
South Coast (New South Wales)